The National Junior Honor Society (NJHS) is an international student organization that consists of chapters in middle schools (in the range of grades 6-9 depending on the school).  The NJHS was founded by the National Association of Secondary School Principals, and today has chapters in the United States, other U.S. territories, and around the world. To be considered for membership, applicants must reach the five standards which include leadership, citizenship, character, service, and scholarship. The National Junior Honor Society recognizes students who exemplify leadership and citizenship, as well as provide educational opportunities. For the scholarship standard, the student scholar must have a minimum grade point average (GPA) of 3.0 from a scale of 4.0. This, however, can vary between schools.

History 
The NJHS was established by the NASSP in 1929. The first chapter was established in Webster Groves High School in Missouri. The NJHS was established "to create enthusiasm for scholarship; to stimulate a desire to render service; to promote leadership; to encourage responsible citizenship; and to develop character in the students of secondary schools."

Internal Structure 
The NJHS is governed by the NJHS National Constitution. The NJHS is controlled by the NASSP Board of Directors, who are advised by the Student Leadership Advisory Committee. Members of this committee serve terms no longer than two years. Any secondary public school can apply for a local chapter. Schools which have been chartered like so can organize state organizations. 

On a chapter basis, the principal of the school possesses many powers, including the power to approve all decisions of the chapter. The principal also appoints a chapter adviser and a Faculty Council composed of five members. The chapter adviser is responsible for the day-to-day supervision of the chapter. The Faculty Council develops procedures for the selection, discipline, and dismissal of members. Everything done by a chapter must be in compliance with the NJHS National Constitution.

Membership 
Membership is based on "outstanding scholarship, character, leadership, service, and citizenship." Once selected, these members have the responsibility to demonstrate these qualities. Potential candidates must be in sixth to ninth grade and in the second semester. Candidates must also have a 3.0 GPA. Candidates will be judged and selected by a majority vote of the Faculty Council on the criteria of service, leadership, character, and citizenship. Honorary memberships can be awarded to those who warrant special consideration.

References

External links
 

Child-related organizations in the United States
Honor societies
Student organizations established in 1929
1929 establishments in the United States
Youth organizations based in Virginia
1929 establishments in Missouri